Minamoto no Tomochika (源具親, dates unknown) was a waka poet and Japanese nobleman active in the early Kamakura period.

In 1233, (Tenpuku era), he took tonsure as a Buddhist monk and was given the Dharma name Nyoshun (如舜).

External links 
E-text of his poems in Japanese

References

Japanese poets
Minamoto clan
People of Kamakura-period Japan
Japanese Buddhist clergy
Kamakura period Buddhist clergy
13th-century Buddhist monks
Year of birth unknown
Year of death unknown